The Thomas D. Clareson Award for Distinguished Service is presented by the Science Fiction Research Association for outstanding service activities.  Particularly recognized are: promotion of SF teaching and study, editing, reviewing, editorial writing, publishing, organizing meetings, mentoring, and leadership in SF/fantasy organizations.
 
Previous winners include:
1996 - Frederik Pohl 
1997 - James Gunn 
1998 - Elizabeth Anne Hull
1999 - David G. Hartwell 
2000 - Arthur O. Lewis 
2001 - Donald "Mack" Hassler 
2002 - Joan Gordon
2003 - Joe Sanders
2004 - Patricia S. Warrick
2005 - Muriel Becker
2006 - Paul Kincaid
2007 - Michael Levy
2008 - Andrew Sawyer
2009 - Hal Hall
2010 - David Mead
2011 - The Tiptree Motherboard (Karen Joy Fowler, Debbie Notkin, Ellen Klages, Jeanne Gomoll, Jeff Smith, and Pat Murphy)
2012	Arthur B. Evans
2013	Rob Latham
2014	Lisa Yaszek
2015	Farah Mendlesohn
2017

Notes 

Academic science fiction awards